Munglinup is a small town located in the Shire of Ravensthorpe in the Goldfields–Esperance region of Western Australia.

The town lies on the South Coast Highway between Ravensthorpe and Esperance and close to the Munglinup River.  The river for most of its course defines the boundary of the Esperance and Ravensthorpe shires.  At the Oldfield Estuary, the boundary goes to the eastern shore.

The word Munglinup is Noongar in origin and means where young people met their in-laws. The name first appears on maps made by the Dempster brothers, early settlers of the area in 1868.

The region was first opened up for farming in the late 1950s.  By the early 1960s, the community asked for a townsite between Esperance and Ravensthorpe to be considered. The townsite was surveyed in 1961 and gazetted in 1962.

The surrounding areas produce wheat and other cereal crops. The town is a receival site for Cooperative Bulk Handling.

References 

Shire of Ravensthorpe
Grain receival points of Western Australia